John Guise may refer to:
Sir John Guise, 2nd Baronet (c.1654–1695), English MP for Gloucestershire
Sir John Guise, 3rd Baronet (c.1678–1732), English MP for Great Marlow and Gloucestershire 
John Guyse (1680–1761), also spelt Guise, English minister
John Guise (British Army officer) (1682/3–1765), art collector
Sir John Guise, 4th Baronet (1701–1769), MP for Aylesbury
Sir John Guise, 1st Baronet (1733–1794), of the Guise baronets
Sir John Wright Guise, 3rd Baronet GCB (1777–1865), of the Guise baronets
John Christopher Guise (1826–1895), British Army officer, Victoria Cross recipient
John Lindsay Guise (1903–1991), English cricketer
Sir John Guise (1914–1991), Governor-General of Papua New Guinea
Sir John Guise, 7th Baronet (1927–2007), of the Guise baronets

See also
John of Lothringen-Guise